Best Director is the name of an award which is presented by various film, television and theatre organizations, festivals, and people's awards. It may refer to:

Film awards 
 AACTA Award for Best Direction
 Academy Award for Best Director
 BAFTA Award for Best Direction
 Best Director Award (Cannes Film Festival)
 César Award for Best Director
 Citra Award for Best Director
Detroit Film Critics Society Award for Best Director
 Empire Award for Best Director
 Empire Award for Best British Director
 European Film Award for Best Director
 Golden Globe Award for Best Director
 Goya Award for Best Director
 Independent Spirit Award for Best Director
 Japan Academy Prize for Director of the Year
 MTV Video Music Award for Best Direction, called Award for Best Director in 2007
New York Film Critics Circle Award for Best Director
 Polish Academy Award for Best Director
 Satellite Award for Best Director
 Saturn Award for Best Director

Television awards 
 Primetime Emmy Award for Outstanding Directing for a Comedy Series 
 Primetime Emmy Award for Outstanding Directing for a Drama Series
 Primetime Emmy Award for Outstanding Directing for a Miniseries, Movie or a Dramatic Special
 MuchMusic Video Award for Best Director

Theatre awards 
 Tony Award for Best Direction of a Musical
 Tony Award for Best Direction of a Play
 Tony Award for Best Director